The elections for the Municipal Corporation of Delhi were held on 23 April 2017. The next elections will held in 2022. The results were declared on 26 April 2017 in which BJP was elected. The total turnout for the election was 54%. The major parties contesting the election are BJP, INC and AAP.

Schedule

Delimitation exercise
In 2016,  delimitation was carried out for MCD elections. the average population of each ward was to be 60,000 with a variation of 10% to 15%.

Election results
The votes were counted and result was declared on 26 April 2017.

2021 By election 
In 2021, by elections were conducted by Delhi Election Commission in the following 5 vacant seats:

See also

 Municipal Corporation of Delhi

References

2017 elections in India
Local elections in Delhi
2010s in Delhi
Delhi